Elatobia fuliginosella is a moth of the family Tineidae. It was described by Friederike Lienig and Philipp Christoph Zeller in 1846. It is found in almost all of Europe, except Ireland, Great Britain, Portugal, the Benelux, Denmark and parts of the Balkan Peninsula, eastwards up to European Russia; in North Africa known from Morocco and Tunisia, eastwards through Siberia up to
Mongolia.

The wingspan is 13–19 mm. Adults have been recorded on wing from June to August.

The larvae feed on insect remains.

References

 "Elatobia fuliginosella (Lienig & Zeller, 1846)". Insecta.pro. Retrieved June 27, 2018.

Moths described in 1846
Tineinae
Moths of Europe